The ISSF 25 meter rapid fire pistol was a competition at the 1972 Summer Olympics. Józef Zapędzki of Poland set an Olympic record of 595 to defend his gold medal. He was the first shooter to defend the gold medal, in this event, since Károly Takács of Hungary defended his gold at the 1948 and 1952 games. Ladislav Falta of Czechoslovakia took silver. Viktor Torshin's bronze put the Soviet Union on the rapid fire pistol podium for the fourth time in five Games. There were 62 competitors from 39 nations. The nations had been limited to two shooters each since the 1952 Games.

As with all shooting events from 1968 to 1980, this event was open to both men and women.

Background

This was the 14th appearance of what had been standardised in 1948 as the men's ISSF 25 meter rapid fire pistol event, the only event on the 2020 programme that traces back to 1896. The event has been held at every Summer Olympics except 1904 and 1928 (when no shooting events were held) and 1908; it was open to women from 1968 to 1980. The first five events were quite different, with some level of consistency finally beginning with the 1932 event—which, though it had differences from the 1924 competition, was roughly similar. The 1936 competition followed the 1932 one quite closely. The post-World War II event substantially altered the competition once again.

Four of the top 10 shooters from 1968 returned: gold medalist Józef Zapędzki of Poland, fourth-place finisher Christian Düring of East Germany, eighth-place finisher Giovanni Liverzani of Italy, and tenth-place finisher Ladislav Falta of Czechoslovakia. Liverzani was the reigning (1970) world champion, with Falta the runner-up. 1952 silver medalist Szilárd Kun of Hungary competed once again, as did 1960 gold medalist William McMillan of the United States.

Luxembourg, New Zealand, San Marino, and the Virgin Islands each made their debut in the event. The United States made its 12th appearance in the event, most of any nation.

Competition format

The competition format followed the 1948 format, now very close to the modern rapid fire pistol competition after significant variation before World War II. Each shooter fired 60 shots. These were done in two courses of 30; each course consisted of two stages of 15; each stage consisted of three series of 5. In each stage, the time limit for each series was 8 seconds for the first, 6 seconds for the second, and 4 seconds for the third.

A holdover from the previous Games was that full-body silhouettes, rather than round targets, continued to be used; however, scoring rings had been added so that now each shot was scored up to 10 rather than being strictly hit or miss.

One change from 1948 to 1956 was that hits were no longer the primary measurement of success. As in 1960–1968, ranking was done by score, regardless of hits.

Records

Prior to the competition, the existing world and Olympic records were as follows.

Józef Zapędzki beat his own Olympic record with 595 points. Ladislav Falta (at 594 points) was also above the old record, while Viktor Torshin matched it.

Schedule

Results

References

External links
Official report pgs. 227 - 228

Shooting at the 1972 Summer Olympics
Men's 1972